Nationality words link to articles with information on the nation's poetry or literature (for instance, Irish or France).

Events
 January 1 – The Gentleman's Magazine is started and edited by Edward Cave ("Sylvanus Urban") in London. Published monthly through September, it will continue into the 20th century.
 October 23 – Fire at Ashburnham House in London damages the nationally-owned Cotton library, housed here at this time. The original manuscript of the Old English The Battle of Maldon is destroyed; the unique manuscript of Beowulf is damaged but saved.

Works published

Colonial America
 Ebenezer Cooke, attributed, The Maryland Muse, a collection, including "The History of Colonel Nathaniel Bacon's Rebellion"
 Richard Lewis, Food for Criticks, criticizing fellow American colonists for not respecting and revering the land as the Indians did
 John Seccomb, "Father Abbey's Will", popular, humorous verse, written when the author was a student at Harvard, about one of the college's custodians and bed-makers; it prompts a sequel, "A Letter of Courtship", addressed to Father Abbey's widow from a custodian at Yale, an example of the rivalry between the two early schools

United Kingdom
 Nicholas Amhurst, writing under the pen name "Caleb D'Anvers", A Collection of Poems on Several Occasions
 Samuel Boyse, Translations and Poems Written on Several Subjects
 Robert Dodsley:
 An Epistle from a Footman in London to the Celebrated Stephen Duck, published anonymously
 A Sketch of the Miseries of Poverty, anonymous
 Aaron Hill, Advice to the Poets
 Alexander Pope, An Epistle to the Right Honourable Richard Earl of Burlington, also known later as The Epistle "Of Taste" (see also Bramston, The Man of Taste 1733
 John Wilmot, Earl of Rochester, Poems on Several Occasions. By the R. H. the E. of R., London, posthumous

Births

Death years link to the corresponding "[year] in poetry" article:
 January 9 – John Scott (died 1783), English poet and friend of Samuel Johnson
 April 16 – Jacob Bailey (died 1808), Church of England clergyman and poet born in the United States (colony of New Hampshire), immigrated to Nova Scotia, Canada in 1779
 Before June 11 – Francis Grose (died 1791), English antiquary, draughtsman and lexicographer
 September 2 – Johann Friedrich von Cronegk (died 1758), German dramatist, poet and essayist
 September 21 – Samuel Bishop (died 1795), English poet
 November 26 – William Cowper (died 1800), English poet
 December 12 – Erasmus Darwin (died 1802), English physician, natural philosopher, physiologist, inventor and poet (grandfather of Charles Darwin)
 John Freeth (died 1808), English provincial poet and coffee-house proprietor
 Ephraim Kuh (died 1790), German poet
 Approximate date – William Woty (died 1791), English writer of light verse and law clerk

Deaths
Birth years link to the corresponding "[year] in poetry" article:
 February 3 – Elizabeth Thomas (born 1675), English poet
 February 20 – Frances Norton, Lady Norton (born 1644), English religious poet and prose writer
 March 5 – Abd al-Ghani al-Nabulsi (born 1641), Syrian Arabic scholar
 April 24 or April 25 (exact date unknown) – Daniel Defoe (born 1659), English author, writer, journalist, spy and poet, probably while in hiding from his creditors. He is interred in Bunhill Fields, London, where his grave can still be visited
 May 11 – Mary Astell (born 1666), English feminist writer
 June 20 – Ned Ward (born 1667), English satirical writer and publican
 December 26 – Antoine Houdar de la Motte, 59 (born 1672), French poet and author

See also

 Poetry
 List of years in poetry
 List of years in literature
 18th century in poetry
 18th century in literature
 Augustan poetry
 Scriblerus Club

Notes

18th-century poetry
Poetry